George Robbins may refer to:

 George R. Robbins (1808–1875), U.S. Representative from New Jersey
 G. Collier Robbins (born 1823), mayor of Portland, Oregon, U.S., 1860–1861
 George Robbins (footballer) (1903–1998), Australian rules footballer